Stanley Abram Karnow (February 4, 1925 – January 27, 2013) was an American journalist and historian.  He is best known for his writings on the Vietnam War.

Education and career
After serving with the United States Army Air Forces in the China Burma India Theater during World War II, he graduated from Harvard with a bachelor's degree in 1947; in 1947 and 1948 he attended the Sorbonne, and from 1948 to 1949 the Institut d'Études Politiques de Paris. He then began his career in journalism as Time correspondent in Paris in 1950. After covering Europe, the Middle East, and Africa (where he was North Africa bureau chief in 1958-59), he went to Asia, where he spent the most influential part of his career.  He was friends with Anthony Lewis and Bernard Kalb.

He covered Asia from 1959 until 1974 for Time, Life, the Saturday Evening Post, the London Observer, the Washington Post, and NBC News. Present in Vietnam in July 1959 when the first Americans were killed, he reported on the Vietnam War in its entirety. This landed him a place on the master list of Nixon political opponents. It was during this time that he began to write Vietnam: A History (1983).

He was chief correspondent for the 13-hour Vietnam: A Television History series, which premiered on PBS in 1983 and later re-aired on PBS's American Experience; it won six Emmy Awards, a Peabody Award, a George Polk Award and a DuPont-Columbia Award. In 1990, Karnow won the Pulitzer Prize for History for his book In Our Image: America's Empire in the Philippines.  In 1992, he co-authored a book with the journalist Nancy Yoshihara, one of the founders of the Asian American Journalists Association, called Asian Americans in Transition. His other books include Mao and China: From Revolution to Revolution, which was nominated for a National Book Award; and Paris in the Fifties (1997), a memoir history of his own experiences of living in Paris in the 1950s.  He also worked for The New Republic and King Features Syndicate.

Later in life, he tried to write a book on Asians in the United States.  A book on Jewish humor progressed only to an outline.  He also contemplated a memoir to be titled Interesting times or Out of Asia.

Personal life
Stanley Karnow was born in a Jewish family in Brooklyn on Feb. 4, 1925, the son of Harry and Henriette Koeppel Karnow (Karnofsky). He married the famous French journalist Claude Sarraute. They divorced in 1955.

In 1959, he married Annette Kline, an artist who was working at the time as cultural attaché for the U.S. State Department in Algiers. Annette died of cancer in July 2009. They had a son and a daughter.

Karnow belonged to the Council on Foreign Relations and the American Society of Historians.

Karnow died on January 27, 2013, at his home in Potomac, Maryland, at age 87 of congestive heart failure.

Works

 

 
 
 
(Preface) The First Time I Saw Paris: Photographs and Memories from the City of Light, Times Books, 1999.

References

External links

 Remembering Journalist Stanley Karnow Excerpt of his interview on NPRs Fresh Air
Booknotes interview with Karnow on In Our Image: America's Empire in the Philippines, May 28, 1989.

1925 births
2013 deaths
Time (magazine) people
American male journalists
Historians of the Vietnam War
Pulitzer Prize for History winners
Sciences Po alumni
United States Army Air Forces personnel of World War II
United States Army Air Forces soldiers
The Harvard Crimson people
American people of Hungarian-Jewish descent
Jewish American historians
The Saturday Evening Post people
The Washington Post journalists
University of Paris alumni
NBC News people
The New Republic people
People from Brooklyn
Harvard Kennedy School faculty
Journalists from New York City
Harvard College alumni
Historians from New York (state)